Pieckowo  (German Pötschendorf) is a small village in north-east Poland. It is located in Warmian-Masurian Voivodship in Kętrzyn County in Reszel Commune.

History

The Pieckowo was founded at 1448 in the monastic state of the Teutonic Knights as named Pötschendorf.

Population

The population of Pieckowo is about 288 (2007).

Lake
In Pieckowo is small lake named Jezioro Pieckowskie (Amtssee). It has an area of 18.9 ha (46.7 acres).

External links
 Pieckowo - village website 
 http://www.territorial.de/ostp/rastb/poetsch.htm 
 https://web.archive.org/web/20060525051759/http://www.pokolms.de/ahnen/doerfer/blrastbg.htm 

Pieckowo